Chromodoris magnifica is a sea slug, a species of nudibranch, a shell-less marine gastropod mollusc in the family Chromodorididae. It is the type species of the genus Chromodoris.

Distribution
This nudibranch is found in the central area of the Indo-Pacific region from Indonesia and the Philippines to New Guinea and Eastern Australia.

Description
The body is elongate with a foot which is distinct from the upper body by a skirt like mantle hiding partially the foot.
The branched gills and the rhinophores are orange colour and can be withdrawn into specific pockets under the skin in case of danger.
The specific epithet magnifica in Chromodoris magnifica means magnificent, so-named because of this nudibranch's striking, vibrant colors.

The background colour of the body is bluish white which varies in intensity from one specimen to another.
On the mantle, the bluish area is outlined by two continuous black lines and a median continuous line crosses it also. These bluish parts are often marked with dash-like black lines.
The margin of the mantle is bordered with a large white band with a central orange colour line, the width of these lines is variable for each specimen.
The foot has three black continuous longitudinal lines. Its background colour is the same as its mantle. The margin of the foot is outlined by an orange and a white line.

This species is easily confused with the similar looking Chromodoris quadricolor. Chromodoris magnifica can be distinguished by its submarginal orange border.

Ecology

Chromodoris magnifica feeds on sponges and has been observed feeding on red and grey sponges.

References

External links
 

Chromodorididae
Gastropods described in 1832